This is a list of singles that charted in the top ten of the Billboard Hot 100 during 2002.

Ashanti scored five top ten hits during the year with "Always on Time", "What's Luv?", "Foolish", "Down 4 U", and "Happy", the most among all other artists.

Top-ten singles

2001 peaks

2003 peaks

See also
 2002 in music
 List of Hot 100 number-one singles of 2002 (U.S.)
 Billboard Year-End Hot 100 singles of 2002

References

General sources

Joel Whitburn Presents the Billboard Hot 100 Charts: The 2000s
Additional information obtained can be verified within Billboard's online archive services and print editions of the magazine.

2002
United States Hot 100 Top 10 Singles